Cherlo Donakonda is a village and panchayat in Ardhaveedu Mandal in Prakasam district in the state of Andhra Pradesh in India.

Geography 

References 

Villages in Prakasam district